Ernest Henry Calloway (born January 1, 1948) is a former American football defensive lineman who played four seasons with the Philadelphia Eagles of the National Football League (NFL). He was drafted by the Eagles in the second round of the 1969 NFL Draft. He played college football at Texas Southern University and attended Jones High School in Orlando, Florida. Calloway was also a member of the Florida Blazers of the World Football League (WFL).

References

External links
Just Sports Stats
WFL profile

1948 births
Living people
American football defensive linemen
Florida Blazers players
Philadelphia Eagles players
Jones High School (Orlando, Florida) alumni
Texas Southern Tigers football players
Players of American football from Orlando, Florida
African-American players of American football
21st-century African-American people
20th-century African-American sportspeople